Nes Marie Rodríguez Tirado (born 3 July 1992) is a Puerto Rican freestyle wrestler. She won one of the bronze medals in the women's 57 kg event at the 2019 Pan American Games held in Lima, Peru.

Career 

In 2015, she competed in the women's freestyle 53 kg event at the World Wrestling Championships held in Las Vegas, United States where she was eliminated in her first match by Jong Myong-suk of North Korea.

At the 2020 Pan American Wrestling Championships held in Ottawa, Canada, she won the silver medal in the 59 kg event. In May 2021, she failed to qualify for the Olympics at the World Olympic Qualification Tournament held in Sofia, Bulgaria.

Major results

References

External links 
 

Living people
1992 births
Place of birth missing (living people)
Puerto Rican female sport wrestlers
Pan American Games medalists in wrestling
Pan American Games bronze medalists for Puerto Rico
Medalists at the 2019 Pan American Games
Wrestlers at the 2019 Pan American Games
Central American and Caribbean Games medalists in wrestling
Central American and Caribbean Games silver medalists for Puerto Rico
Competitors at the 2014 Central American and Caribbean Games
Competitors at the 2018 Central American and Caribbean Games
Pan American Wrestling Championships medalists
20th-century Puerto Rican women
21st-century Puerto Rican women